Radio Austral is an FM radio station based in Fairfield 
 
The station can be heard between North Sydney and Campbelltown on 87.8 MHz.

Editor and Director in Chief is Eduardo Mariano Gonzalez Cristobal

See also	
 List of radio stations in Australia

References

External links

Radio stations in Sydney
Radio stations in Canberra
Spanish-language radio stations